S21 or S-21 may refer to:

Automobiles 
 Chery S21, a city car
 Sisu S-21, a Finnish lorry

Aviation 
 De Schelde S.21, a proposed Dutch fighter
 Rans S-21 Outbound, an American homebuilt aircraft
 SIAI S.21, an Italian racing flying boat
 Sikorsky S-21, the first four-engine aircraft in the world
 Short S.21 Maia, a British flying boat mother ship
 Spalinger S.21, a Swiss training glider
 Sukhoi-Gulfstream S-21, a proposed American business jet
 Sunriver Airport in Sunriver, Oregon

Rail and transit

Lines 
 S21 (Berlin), a planned S-Bahn line in Berlin, Germany
 S21 (RER Fribourg), an S-Bahn line in the canton of Freibourg, Switzerland
 S21 (ZVV), an S-Bahn line in the cantons of Zürich and Zug in Switzerland
 Stuttgart 21, a transportation and urban project in Stuttgart, Germany
 S21, a line of the Hamburg S-Bahn

Stations 
 Ginzan Station, in Niki, Hokkaidō, Hokkaidō, Japan
 Moto-Yawata Station, in Ichikawa, Chiba, Japan
 Shin-Fukae Station, in Osaka, Japan
 Tokushige Station, in Midori-ku, Nagoya, Aichi, Japan

Roads 
 S21 Guangzhou–Huidong Expressway, China
 County Route S21 (California), United States

Submarines 
 , of the Argentine Navy
 
 , of the Royal Navy
 , of the Indian Navy
 , of the Indian Navy
 , of the United States Navy

Other uses 
 40S ribosomal protein S21
 British NVC community S21, a swamps and tall-herb fens community in the British National Vegetation Classification system
 S-21: The Khmer Rouge Killing Machine, a 2003 documentary film 
 S21: When using do not smoke, a safety phrase
 Samsung Galaxy S21, a series of smartphones
 Security Prison 21, now the Tuol Sleng Genocide Museum in Cambodia
 Serbia 21, a political organization in Serbia